Borowa  is a village in Mielec County, Subcarpathian Voivodeship, in south-eastern Poland. It is the seat of the gmina (administrative district) called Gmina Borowa.

The village has a population of 1,451.

References

Borowa